Göktürk is a neighborhood (previously a village) of Eyüp district in Istanbul Province, Turkey.

Kemerburgaz quarter is located within the boundaries of Göktürk.

Göktürk is served by the public bus lines.

Transportation

Bus Lines 
48: Göktürk - Mecidiyeköy
48A: Göktürk - Kazlıçeşme Marmaray
 48D: Göktürk - Hacıosman Metro
 48E: Göktürk - Eminönü
 48G: Göktürk - Pirinççiköy - Mescid-i Selam
 48K: Kemerburgaz - Ağaçlı
 48L: Göktürk - 4. Levent Metro
 48P: Kemerburgaz - Akpınar
 48KA: Kemerburgaz - Arnavutköy
 48Y: Göktürk - Yeşilpınar
 H-2:  Mecidiyeköy - Istanbul Airport (Only night service)

References

External links

Neighbourhoods of Eyüp